Ghrelin (or lenomorelin, INN) is a hormone produced by enteroendocrine cells of the gastrointestinal tract, especially the stomach, and is often called a "hunger hormone" because it increases the drive to eat. Blood levels of ghrelin are highest before meals when hungry, returning to lower levels after mealtimes. Ghrelin may help prepare for food intake by increasing gastric motility and stimulating the secretion of gastric acid.

Ghrelin activates cells in the anterior pituitary gland and hypothalamic arcuate nucleus, including neuropeptide Y neurons that initiate appetite. Ghrelin stimulates brain structures having a specific receptor – the growth hormone secretagogue receptor 1A (GHSR-1A). Ghrelin also participates in regulation of reward cognition, learning and memory, the sleep-wake cycle, taste sensation, reward behavior, and glucose metabolism.

History and name
Ghrelin was discovered after the ghrelin receptor (called growth hormone secretagogue type 1A receptor or GHS-R) was determined in 1999. The hormone name is based on its role as a growth hormone-releasing peptide, with reference to the Proto-Indo-European root gʰre-, meaning "to grow".

Gene, transcription products, and structure

The GHRL gene produces mRNA which has four exons. Five products arise: the first is the 117-amino acid preproghrelin. It is homologous to promotilin; both are members of the motilin family. It is cleaved to produce proghrelin which is cleaved to produce an unacylated 28-amino acid  ghrelin and an acylated C-ghrelin. Obestatin is presumed to be  cleaved from  C-ghrelin.

Ghrelin only becomes active when caprylic (octanoic) acid is linked posttranslationally to serine at the 3-position by the enzyme ghrelin O-acyltransferase (GOAT) to form a proteolipid. It is located on the cell membrane of ghrelin cells in the stomach and pancreas. The non-octanoylated form is desacyl ghrelin. It does not activate the GHS-R receptor but does have other effects: cardiac, anti-ghrelin, appetite stimulation, and inhibition of hepatic glucose output. Side-chains other than octanoyl have also been observed: these can also trigger the ghrelin receptor.  In particular, decanoyl ghrelin has been found to constitute a significant portion of circulating ghrelin in mice, but as of 2011 its presence in humans has not been established.

Ghrelin cells

Alternative names
The ghrelin cell is also known as an A-like cell (pancreas), X-cell (for unknown function), X/A-like cell (rats), Epsilon cell (pancreas), P/D sub 1 cell (humans) and Gr cell (abbreviation for ghrelin cell).

Location
Ghrelin cells are found mainly in the stomach and duodenum, but also in the jejunum, lungs, pancreatic islets, gonads, adrenal cortex, placenta, and kidney. It has also been shown that ghrelin is produced locally in the brain.

Ghrelin cells are also found in oxyntic glands (20% of cells), pyloric glands, and small intestine.

Features
They are ovoid cells with granules. They have gastrin receptors. Some produce nesfatin-1. Ghrelin cells are not terminally differentiated in the pancreas: they are progenitor cells that can give rise to A-cells, PP cells and Beta-cells there.

Function and mechanism of action
Ghrelin is a participant in regulating the complex process of energy homeostasis which adjusts both energy input – by adjusting hunger signals – and energy output – by adjusting the proportion of energy going to ATP production, fat storage, glycogen storage, and short-term heat loss. The net result of these processes is reflected in body weight, and is under continuous monitoring and adjustment based on metabolic signals and needs. At any given moment in time, it may be in equilibrium or disequilibrium. Gastric-brain communication is an essential part of energy homeostasis, and several communication pathways are probable, including the gastric intracellular mTOR/S6K1 pathway mediating the interaction among ghrelin, nesfatin and endocannabinoid gastric systems, and both afferent and efferent vagal signals.

Ghrelin and synthetic ghrelin mimetics (growth hormone secretagogues) increase body weight and fat mass by triggering receptors in the arcuate nucleus that include neuropeptide Y (NPY) and agouti-related protein (AgRP) neurons. Ghrelin-responsiveness of these neurons is both leptin- and insulin-sensitive. Ghrelin reduces the sensitivity of gastric vagal afferents, so they are less sensitive to gastric distension.

In addition to its function in energy homeostasis, ghrelin also activates the cholinergic–dopaminergic reward link in inputs to the ventral tegmental area and in the mesolimbic pathway, a circuit that communicates the hedonic and reinforcing aspects of natural rewards, such as food and addictive drugs such as ethanol. Ghrelin receptors are located on neurons in this circuit. Hypothalamic ghrelin signalling is required for reward from alcohol and palatable/rewarding foods.

Ghrelin has been linked to inducing appetite and feeding behaviors. Circulating ghrelin levels are the highest right before a meal and the lowest right after. Injections of ghrelin in both humans and rats have been shown to increase food intake in a dose-dependent manner. So the more ghrelin that is injected the more food that is consumed. However, ghrelin does not increase meal size, only meal number. Ghrelin injections also increase an animal's motivation to seek out food, behaviors including increased sniffing, foraging for food, and hoarding food. Body weight is regulated through energy balance, the amount of energy taken in versus the amount of energy expended over an extended period of time. Studies have shown that ghrelin levels are positively correlated with weight. This data suggests that ghrelin functions as an adiposity signal, a messenger between the body's energy stores and the brain.

Blood levels
Blood levels are in the pmol/L or fmol/mL range. Both active and total ghrelin can be measured.  Circulating ghrelin concentrations rise before eating and fall afterward, more strongly in response to protein and carbohydrate than to lipids. The plasma ghrelin-like immunoreactivity concentration measured with a particular radioimmunoassay in a typical human is 166.0 + 10.1 fmol/mL. Serum ghrelin concentrations tend to increase in age and vary throughout the day, with values peaking while one is asleep.

Ghrelin receptor
The ghrelin receptor GHS-R1a (a splice-variant of the growth hormone secretagogue receptor, with the GHS-R1b splice being inactive) is involved in mediating a wide variety of biological effects of ghrelin, including: stimulation of growth hormone release, increase in hunger, modulation of glucose and lipid metabolism, regulation of gastrointestinal motility and secretion, protection of neuronal and cardiovascular cells, and regulation of immune function. They are present in high density in the hypothalamus and pituitary, on the vagus nerve (on both afferent cell bodies and efferent nerve endings) and throughout the gastrointestinal tract.

Locations of action

Glucose metabolism
The entire ghrelin system (dAG, AG, GHS-R and GOAT) has a gluco-regulatory action.

Sleep
Preliminary research indicates that ghrelin participates in the regulation of circadian rhythms. A review reported finding strong evidence that sleep restriction affected ghrelin or leptin levels, or energy expenditure.

Reproductive system
Ghrelin has inhibitory effects on gonadotropin-releasing hormone (GnRH) secretion. It may cause decreased fertility.

Fetus and neonate
Ghrelin is produced early by the fetal lung and promotes lung growth. Umbilical cord blood levels of ghrelin show a correlation between ghrelin levels and birth weight.

Anorexia and obesity
Ghrelin levels in the plasma of obese individuals are lower than those in leaner individuals, suggesting that ghrelin does not contribute to obesity, except in the cases of Prader–Willi syndrome-induced obesity, where high ghrelin levels are correlated with increased food intake. Those with anorexia nervosa have high plasma levels of ghrelin compared to both the constitutionally thin and normal-weight controls. The level of ghrelin increases during the time of day from midnight to dawn in thinner people, which suggests there is a flaw in the circadian rhythm of obese individuals. Ghrelin levels are high in people with cancer-induced cachexia. There is insufficient evidence to conclude either for or against use of ghrelin in managing cachexia associated with cancer.

Disease management

Gastric bypass surgery
Gastric bypass surgery not only reduces gut capacity for food, but also lowers ghrelin levels compared to both lean people and those who lost weight through dieting. Studies have not clarified whether ghrelin levels return to normal in people who had gastric bypass surgery after weight loss has stabilized. Gastric bypass surgery involving vertical-sleeve gastrectomy reduces plasma ghrelin levels by about 60% in the long term.

See also 
 Hypothalamic–pituitary–somatic axis
 List of growth hormone secretagogues
Leptin

References

External links 

 
 

Appetite stimulants
Ghrelin receptor agonists
Growth hormone secretagogues
Hormones of the somatotropic axis
Neuropeptides
Obesity
Peptide hormones
World Anti-Doping Agency prohibited substances